Mohammed Karim Samed Abdul (born 3 May 2002) is a Ghanaian footballer who currently plays as a defender for Ghana Premier League side WAFA.

Club career 
Abdul started his senior career with West African Football Academy in October 2018. He made his debut during the 2019 GFA Normalization Competition. On 19 May 2019, he made his debut by playing the full 90 minutes of a 4–2 away loss to International Allies. He made one extra appearance against Liberty Professionals before the competition ended. During the 2019–20 season, he made 5 league appearances before the league was brought to an abrupt end due to the outbreak of COVID-19 in Ghana. He was adjudged the man of the match on game week 8 in a match against Legon Cities even though WAFA lost by 1–0 through a penalty kick from Joseph Adjei.

International career 
In August 2018, Abdul was called up to the Ghana national U-17 team by Karim Zito ahead of the 2019 U-17 AFCON qualifiers West B Zone Tournament. He played in the opening match and subsequent matches as Ghana placed second and failed to qualify for the main tournament after losing to Nigeria on penalty shootout. In January 2021, he was named as part of the initial 24-man squad for the Ghana U20 side to begin preparations towards the 2021 Africa U-20 Cup of Nations however he did not make the final squad for the tournament.

References

External links 
 

Living people
2002 births
Association football defenders
Ghanaian footballers
West African Football Academy players
Ghana Premier League players
Ghana youth international footballers